Heriberto Enrique Ortega Ramírez (born 16 July 1954) is a Mexican politician affiliated with the Institutional Revolutionary Party. As of 2014 he served as Deputy of the LIX Legislature of the Mexican Congress representing the State of Mexico as replacement of Arturo Osornio.

References

1954 births
Living people
Politicians from the State of Mexico
Institutional Revolutionary Party politicians
Deputies of the LIX Legislature of Mexico
Members of the Chamber of Deputies (Mexico) for the State of Mexico